Elections to the Supreme Soviet of the Estonian SSR were held on 24 February 1985. The Bloc of Communists and Non-Partisans was the only party able to contest the elections, and won all 285 seats.

Results

See also
List of members of the Supreme Soviet of the Estonian Soviet Socialist Republic, 1985–1990

References

Estonia
Single-candidate elections
One-party elections
1985 in Estonia
Parliamentary elections in Estonia
Estonian Soviet Socialist Republic
Election and referendum articles with incomplete results